Julio Echenique (born 27 May 1959) is a Cuban weightlifter. He competed in the men's middleweight event at the 1980 Summer Olympics.

References

1959 births
Living people
Cuban male weightlifters
Olympic weightlifters of Cuba
Weightlifters at the 1980 Summer Olympics
People from Pinar del Río
World Weightlifting Championships medalists
Pan American Games medalists in weightlifting
Pan American Games gold medalists for Cuba
Weightlifters at the 1983 Pan American Games
20th-century Cuban people
21st-century Cuban people